Phragmoteuthida is an order of extinct coleoid cephalopods characterized by a fan-like teuthoid pro-ostracum  attached to a belemnoid-like phragmocone.

Diagnosis
Jeletzky characterized phragmoteuthids as having a  large tripartite, fanlike pro-ostracum forming the longest portion of the shell, attached to about three-quarters of the circumference of a comparatively small breviconic phragmocone with short camerae and superficially belemnitid-like siphuncle, an absent or much reduced rostrum at the apical part of the phragmocone, belemnite-like arm hooks, an ink sack, beaks resembling those of Recent teuthids, and a muscular mantle.

Donovan (2006), gives a similar description for Phragmoteuthis: Phragmocones as having an apical angle of between 20 and 30 degrees, and relatively few chambers compared with belemnoids; a multi-layered conotheca, thick-walled siphuncle, and a long, three-lobed pro-ostracum as in the Triassic species. Arms are short and bear pairs of slightly curved hooks.

Classification

 Order †Phragmoteuthida
Family †Phragmoteuthididae
Genus †Permoteuthis
Genus †Phragmoteuthis
"unnamed form"
Family †Rhiphaeoteuthidae
Genus †Rhiphaeoteuthis

References

Prehistoric cephalopod orders
Belemnoidea
Permian first appearances
Jurassic extinctions